Timo Jussi Penttilä (16 March 1931 – 25 February 2011) was one of Finland's most important modernist architects and was for over 15 years a professor at the Academy of Fine Arts Vienna in Austria. He is most renowned for the design of the Helsinki City Theatre (1961–67).

Early life and education 
Timo Jussi Penttilä was born 16 March 1931 in Tampere to Arvo Mikko Penttilä and Ester Elviira Matinheimo. His father was agronomist and acted as a supervisor improving cattle in the country. Penttilä graduated from Tampere secondary school in 1950 and went on to study architecture at Helsinki University of Technology, graduating in 1956.

Career
In 1957–1959 he worked for architect Aarne Ervi before founding his own office. His breakthrough work was Sampola House, the Tampere Adult Education Centre, which Penttilä designed together with Kari Virta in 1958 and which was completed in 1960. The following year, at the age of 30, Penttilä won the architecture competition for the design of the Helsinki City Theatre, a work which when completed in 1967 received much critical acclaim. The building is an example of Penttilä's soft, human-centric Modernism which has similarities to the mature works of Finland's most well-known architect, Alvar Aalto; indeed the building is often mistakenly assumed to be an Aalto design.

The Helsinki City Theatre has remained Penttilä's most renowned work, but among his other building designs the best known are the Ratina Stadium in Tampere (1965) the Hanasaari B power station in Helsinki (1974), the Salmisaari power station (with Kari Lind and Heikki Saarela) in Helsinki (1985). During his career, Penttilä was criticized within the Finnish architectural profession for following uncompromisingly the modernist desire for experimentation and for defending the autonomy of architecture.
Penttilä was director of the Museum of Finnish Architecture in 1976–1980, and was a frequent contributor to the Finnish Architecture Review (Arkkitehti) from the late 1960s to the early 1980s, writing a number of polemical articles about architecture and the profession. An exhibition of his works was held at the Royal Institute of British Architects in London in 1980.

During the late 1970s, Penttilä participated in a number of architectural competitions for the design of cultural and public buildings in the Middle East, including Bahrain's cultural centre (1976), the Iranian National Library in Tehran (1978), and the United Arab Emirates Ministry of Foreign Affairs (1979) – but none of which were built. In the later 1980s he courted controversy by designing a series of four 40-storey skyscrapers for the centre of his home town, Tampere. Local grass-roots opposition brought an end to the scheme which had been commissioned by the industrial company Tampella to redevelop an area where their factory then presently stood.

Penttilä was a visiting lecturer at the University of California, Berkeley in 1968–69. He was professor of architecture at the Academy of Fine Arts Vienna from 1980 to 1996, where he succeeded Roland Rainer. After his retirement he lived in Italy and Lapland (Finland). Following his death it emerged that he had written an extensive book on architecture theory. This was eventually published in 2013, by the Finnish publishers Gaudeamus, under the title "Oikeat ja väärät arkkitehdit – 2000 vuotta arkkitehtuuriteoriaa" (Right and wrong architects – 2000 years of architecture theory). Excerpts from his notes, written in English, have been in published in Roger Connah's book "The School of Exile – Timo Penttilä for and against architecture theory" (2015).

Penttilä died 25 February 2011 in Helsinki.

Penttilä’s completed works 
 Sampola House, Tampere Adult Education Centre, Tampere, 1960
 Salokunta Church, Sastamala, 1960
 Tampere Business School, Tampere, 1965
 Ratina Stadium, Tampere, 1966
 Private row houses, Tammisalo, Helsinki, 1966
 Helsinki City Theatre, Helsinki, 1967
 Hanasaari power plant, Helsinki, 1976
 Suomen kaupunkiopisto (Finnish city college), Espoo, 1975 (later partly demolished and converted into a hotel) 
 Hirviniemenranta luxury housing development, Helsinki, 1980 (later acquired for housing for the Republic of Korea)
 Suomen Sokeri (Finnish Sugar) headquarters, Tapiola, Espoo, 1980 (demolished 2014)
 Salmisaari power station (with Kari Lind and Heikki Saarela), Helsinki, 1985
 Perusyhtymä Oy, Makrotalo House, Tapiola, Espoo, 1986 (demolished 2018)
 Gumpendorferstraße apartment building, Vienna, 1988

Selection of works by Timo Penttilä

References 
Timo Penttilä: Oikeat ja väärät arkkitehdit – 2000 vuotta arkkitehtuuriteoriaa, Gaudeaumus, Helsinki, 2013.
Timo Penttilä: "Autonomy & authority in architecture," in Finnish Architecture, Royal Institute of British Architects, London, 1980.
Anni Vartola: Kuolkoon suomalainen arkkitehtuuri, Avain, Helsinki, 2007.
Roger Connah: The School of Exile – Timo Penttilä for and against architecture theory, Datutop 33, Tampere, 2015.

External links 
Timo Penttilä – Finnish Architecture Museum website
Timo Penttilä Society
The School of Exile at Finnisharchitecture.fi

1931 births
2011 deaths
Finnish architecture writers
People from Tampere
Finnish expatriates in Austria
Finnish architects
Modernist architects